Bright City is an English Christian worship collective, based out of St Peter's Church in Brighton, United Kingdom.

Career
The collective started out in 2015 with the release of their eponymous debut album Bright City, their breakthrough release on the UK Official Christian & Gospel Albums Chart at No. 2. This was followed by their sophomore release, Hello Maker (2017), with both albums being released on their imprint label, Bright City Collective. Hello Maker was No. 6 on the Official Christian & Gospel Albums Chart. Integrity Music featured the group on its Still instrumental series, with Bright City Presents: Still, Volume 2 being Bright City's third issue in 2018.

Members

The members of the Bright City collective include
 Paul Nelson
 Sarah Bird
 Henry Milne
 Lydia McAllister
 Elle Limebear

Discography

Albums

Singles

References

External links
 
 

Christian pop groups
English Christian rock groups
Musical groups established in 2015
2015 establishments in England